Jnanayasas (Sanskrit; Chinese 闍那耶舍 or 尊稱) was a Buddhist monk from Magadha, eastern India.  He was recognised by Emperor Wen of Sui China and taught the monks Yasogupta and Jnanagupta.

He translated 7 scriptures in 51 fascicles, including:
Sutra of Great Compassion (大悲經)
Sutra of Moon Store (月藏經)

References

Sources
Translators in Sui Dynasty and Tang Dynasty

Sui dynasty Buddhists
Indian Buddhist monks
Indian Buddhist missionaries